Snaxxx is the third studio album by American hip hop artist Mike Mictlan, a member of Minneapolis indie hip hop collective Doomtree. It was released on Doomtree Records on September 27, 2012 for free download via the label's bandcamp. It was named one of PopMatter's top overlooked albums in 2012.

Music 
The album is produced by the likes of Paper Tiger, 2% Muck, DJ Rich-Dog and Mike Frey. Guest appearances include Lizzo, Greg Grease, Spyder Baybie Raw Dog, P.O.S, Z3R0K00L8D, La Manchita, and Freez.

Track listing

References

External links 
 Snaxxx at Bandcamp
 Snaxxx at Discogs

Doomtree Records albums
2012 albums
Hip hop albums by American artists